Torreya is a genus of conifers in the family Taxaceae.

Torreya may also refer to:

 Torreya State Park, Florida
 Torreya grandiflora, a synonym of the flowering plant Synandra
 Torreya, a synonym of the flowering plant Croomia
 Torreya, a journal of the Torrey Botanical Society

See also
 

Taxonomy disambiguation pages